The Complete Jack Johnson Sessions were recorded in April 1970 by Miles Davis, and released in September 2003. These sessions formed the basis for the 1971 album Jack Johnson, as well as some of the studio portions of Live-Evil.

Track listing
All compositions by  Miles Davis except where noted.

 "Right Off" includes an excerpt from an unaccompanied trumpet solo from November 19 or 18, 1969
 "Yesternow" includes excerpts from the unaccompanied November 1969 trumpet solo with arco bass overdubbed, "Shhh/Peaceful" excerpt from February 18, 1969 session In a Silent Way and the unaccompanied November 1969 trumpet solo with the following overdubs: orchestra arranged by Teo Macero and narration by Brock Peters
 "Willie Nelson (Remake Take 2)" and "Duran (Take 6)" were originally released on Directions.
 All takes of "Go Ahead John" were released as one assembled track on Big Fun.
 "Honky Tonk (Take 2)" was partially released on Get Up With It and Live-Evil.
 "Konda" was partially released on Directions.
 "Nem Um Talvez (Take 4A)", "Selim (Take 4B)" and "Little Church (Take 10)" were released on Live-Evil.

(*) Previously Unissued(**) Previously Unissued in Full

Personnel 
 Miles Davis - trumpet
 Bennie Maupin - bass clarinet
 Steve Grossman - soprano saxophone
 Wayne Shorter - soprano saxophone
 Chick Corea - electric piano, organ, electric piano with ring modulator
 Herbie Hancock - organ, Electric Piano
 Keith Jarrett - electric piano, electric piano with wah wah
 Sonny Sharrock - electric guitar, echoplex
 John McLaughlin - electric guitar
 Dave Holland - electric bass, double bass
 Michael Henderson - electric bass
 Gene Perla - electric bass
 Ron Carter - double bass
 Jack DeJohnette - drums
 Billy Cobham - drums
 Lenny White - drums
 Don Alias - percussion
 Airto Moreira - percussion, berimbau, cuica
 Hermeto Pascoal - voice, drums

References

External links
  Article about the making of Jack Johnson and The Complete Jack Johnson Sessions boxed set at the Miles Beyond site, dedicated to the electric music of Miles Davis

Miles Davis compilation albums
2003 compilation albums
Columbia Records compilation albums
Albums recorded at CBS 30th Street Studio